The decade of the 1330s in art involved some significant events.

Events
 1338–1340: Ambrogio Lorenzetti paints The Allegory of Good and Bad Government frescoes in Palazzo Pubblico, Siena, Tuscany
 1339: Italian painter and architect Taddeo Gaddi suffers a serious eye injury while studying solar eclipses

Works

 1330: Giovanni di Agostino sculpts a monument to Bishop Guido Tarlati

Births
 1339: Don Silvestro dei Gherarducci – Italian painter (died 1399)
 1335: André Beauneveu –  Early Netherlandish sculptor and painter (died 1400)
 1332: Wang Lü – Chinese landscape painter, calligrapher, and poet during the Ming dynasty (died unknown)
 1332: Andrea Vanni – Italian painter active mainly in his native Siena (died 1414)
 1330: Jacopo del Casentino – Italian painter active mainly in Tuscany (died 1380)
 1330: Bartolo di Fredi – Italian painter, a member of the Sienese School (died 1410)
 1330: Vitale da Bologna – Italian painter (died 1361)
 1330: Altichiero – Italian painter in the Gothic style (died 1390)
 1330: Hermann von Münster – German master glassmaker (died 1392)
 1330: Wang Yi – Chinese painter of human figures during the Yuan dynasty (died ''unknown)
 1330: Luca di Tommè – Italian tempera painter (died 1389)
 c.1330: Jean de Liège – French sculptor (died 1381)

Deaths
 1339: Giovanni di Balduccio – Italian sculptor (born 1290)
 1337: Giotto di Bondone – Italian painter and architect from Florence (born 1267)
 1337: Tino di Camaino – Italian sculptor (born 1280)
 1330: Pietro Cavallini – Italian painter and mosaic designer (born 1259)
 1330: Lorenzo Maitani – Italian architect and sculptor primarily responsible for the construction and decoration of the façade of Orvieto Cathedral (born 1255)

 
Years of the 14th century in art
Art